Per 100.000 dollari ti ammazzo (literally I will kill you for 100,000 dollars or 100,000 dollars for killing you, internationally released as Vengeance is Mine, For One Hundred Thousand Dollars for a Killing and One Hundred Thousand Dollars Per Killing) is a 1967 Italian Spaghetti Western film. It represents the directorial debut film of Giovanni Fago (here credited as Sidney Lean). On the set of this film Gianni Garko got to know Susanna Martinkova, a Czechoslovakian actress at her debut in an Italian production, who little later married the actor and had a daughter with him.

Plot
Bounty hunter John delivers four wanted criminals, all of them dead. When he checks out the new posters at the sheriff's office he recognises his half-brother Clint on one of them. John could never forget how Clint out of jealousy killed their mutual father and how he blamed the misdeed on John who instead of his brother spent 10 years in prison. Now Clint is good for 6,000 dollars. John has no reservations to go after him because it was Clint who rendered John an outcast with no other chance left to make a living other than by becoming a bounty hunter. When John eventually gets to him, Clint is just fighting with his gang about a booty of 100,000 dollars.

Cast
 Gianni Garko (as Gary Hudson): Johnny Forest
 Claudio Camaso: Clint Forest
 Piero Lulli: Jurago
 Fernando Sancho: Concalves
 Claudie Lange: Anne
 Bruno Corazzari: Gary
 Susanna Martinková: Mary

References

External links
 
 Per 100.000 dollari ti ammazzo at Variety Distribution

1967 films
Spaghetti Western films
1967 Western (genre) films
Films shot in Almería
1967 directorial debut films
Films scored by Nora Orlandi
1960s Italian-language films
Films directed by Giovanni Fago
1960s Italian films